The 1922 United States Senate election in Maryland was held on November 7, 1922.

Incumbent Republican Senator Joseph I. France ran for re-election to a second term in office, but was defeated by Democrat William Cabell Bruce.

Republican primary

Candidates
 Joseph I. France, incumbent Senator since 1917
 John W. Garrett, former U.S. Minister to Venezuela, Argentina, the Netherlands, and Luxembourg

Results

Democratic primary

Candidates
 William Cabell Bruce, Pulitzer Prize-winning historian and candidate for Senate in 1916
 David John Lewis, U.S. Representative from Cumberland and nominee for Senate in 1916
 William I. Norris

Results

General election

Results

Results by county

Counties that flipped from Democrat to Republican
Allegany
St. Mary's

Counties that flipped from Republican to Democrat
Baltimore (City)
Baltimore (County)
Somerset County, Maryland

See also
1922 United States Senate elections
1922 United States elections

References

Notes

1922
Maryland
United States Senate